Tauplitz is a former municipality in the district of Liezen in the Austrian state of Styria. Since the 2015 Styria municipal structural reform, it is part of the municipality Bad Mitterndorf.

Population

Activities

Skiing 
The Tauplitz ski area encompasses 43 piste kilometres across three mountains – the Mitterstein, Lawinenstein and Schneiderkogel. It is part of the wider 120km for the whole Schneebären area that includes 120 piste kilometres. The ski runs in the resort cater to all levels; 18 kilometres are for beginners (blue), 19 kilometres for intermediate (red) and 6 kilometres for the more advanced skiers (black) There are also 130 kilometres of cross-country trails in the area.

Lakes on the Tauplitzalm

References

External links

https://www.domus-global.com/tauplitz-resort-guide

Cities and towns in Liezen District